Albert Cavens (1 October 1906 – 17 December 1985) was a Belgian-born American silent film child actor.

Biography
Cavens moved to the United States soon after birth and began his career only aged 8 in a number of films in 1914, including The Town of Nazareth, also starring Charlotte Burton. However, after 1914, Cavens took a break from acting. He returned to it as an adult over thirty years later, playing Valvert, the nobleman whom Cyrano duels with while reciting a poem, in Cyrano de Bergerac (1950). (Cavens was the son of Fred Cavens, a fencing instructor in Hollywood). Between 1950 and 1969, he made a number of appearances in film and television, and appeared in Star Trek in 1969 shortly before his retirement.

Filmography

References

External links
 

American male film actors
American male silent film actors
American male television actors
American male child actors
Belgian emigrants to the United States
1906 births
1985 deaths
20th-century American male actors
Western (genre) television actors